Judy & David are a Canadian children's music duo formed in 1991 in Richmond Hill, Ontario. They are recipients of a 1998 Juno Award in the category of Juno Award for Children's Album of the Year

Biography
Judy and David are husband and wife and have been making music since 1991. The duo also appears as a television personality, and promotes a live concerts in the Greater Toronto Area. They launched their career in February 1993 with their first concert, the release of Jumpin' Up & Down and the multi-million selling My Little Yellow Bus collection. They are best known for their former TV series, Judy & David's Boom Box on Treehouse TV in Canada and JiggiJump on Kids' CBC.

The band has also won the Parent's Choice Gold Award and Junos. They are now among the most prolific children's recording artists in North America.

The duo's members are David Gershon (born in Chicago, Illinois in 1964) and his wife Judy Adelman Gershon (born in Toronto, Ontario in 1965).

Judy Adelman Gershon is also the Artistic Director of the Toronto Jewish Chorus.
David Gershon is also the chair of  Education Arts Canada.

Recordings 

 Jumpin' Up & Down (1993)
 Animal Wonders: Songs About Our Animal Friends (My Little Yellow Bus Box Set) (1993)
 Magical Musical Journey: Best-Loved Folk Songs (My Little Yellow Bus Box Set) (1993)
 Rhymes, Chimes & Quiet Times: Favourite Nursery Rhymes and Lullabies (My Little Yellow Bus Box Set) (1993)
 Shake It All About: Silly Songs and Musical Games (My Little Yellow Bus Box Set) (1993)
 My Little Red Firetruck Box Set (1993)
 My Little Red Firetruck Box Set Foreign Language Editions (1993)
 Livin' In a Shoe (1997)
 PigMania (2000)
 GoldiRocks (2000)
 Rock N' Roll Matzah Ball (2001)
 BeanStock (2001)
 Red's In the Hood (2001)
 Songs From the Boom Box (2001)
 Livin' In a Shoe Multimedia Edition (2002)
 MathJam K-2 (2004)
 JiggiJump (2007)
 JiggiJump: Healthy Earth, Healthy Me (2011)

Videography 
 Judy & David's Music Shop - Live concert VHS (1996)
 Playground Jam - DVD (2003)
 Treasure Park - DVD (2003)
 Cars, Planes & Choo Choo Trains - DVD (2003)

References

External links
 Judy & David Official Site
 Toronto Jewish Chorus Directed by Judy Adelman Gershon
 educationarts.ca

1991 establishments in Ontario
Canadian children's musical groups
Canadian children's television personalities
Jewish Canadian musicians
Juno Award for Children's Album of the Year winners
Married couples
Musical groups established in 1991